2-EHA may refer to:

 2-Ethylhexanoic acid
 2-Ethylhexyl acrylate